The V. M. Goldschmidt Award is an award given by the Geochemical Society at the V. M. Goldschmidt Conference for achievements in the fields of geochemistry and cosmochemistry. The award in honor of Victor Moritz Goldschmidt, a pioneer in both those fields.

Winners

1972 Paul W. Gast
1973 Robert M. Garrels
1974 Hans E. Suess
1975 Harold C. Urey
1976 Hans P. Eugster
1977 Samuel Epstein
1978 Gerald J. Wasserburg
1979 Harmon Craig
1980 Clair C. Patterson
1981 Robert N. Clayton
1982 Konrad B. Krauskopf
1983 Samuel S. Goldich
1984 Alfred Nier
1985 James B. Thompson Jr.
1986 Claude Allègre
1987 Wallace S. Broecker
1988 Harold C. Helgeson
1989 Karl K. Turekian
1990 Edward Anders
1991 Alfred Edward Ringwood
1992 Stanley R. Hart
1993 S. Ross Taylor
1994 Heinrich D. Holland
1995 Robert A. Berner
1996 Albrecht W. Hofmann
1997 Devendra Lal
1998 Werner Stumm
1999 
2000 Geoffrey Eglinton
2001 Ikuo Kushiro
2002 John M. Hayes
2003 Bernard J. Wood
2004 James R. O'Neil
2005 E. Bruce Watson
2006 Susan Solomon
2007 Guenter Lugmair
2008 Francis Albarède
2009 Mark H. Thiemens
2010 Minoru Ozima
2011 Frank Millero
2012 Edward M. Stolper
2013 Henry "Harry" Elderfield
2014 Timothy Grove
2015 Miriam Kastner
2016 Alexandra Navrotsky
2017 Jill Banfield
2018 Michael A. Arthur
2019 Donald DePaolo
2020 Richard Carlson
2021 Bernard Marty

References

Geochemistry
Earth sciences awards
Geochemical Society